Sujeeth Reddy is an Indian film director and screen-writer. He made his directorial debut in Telugu Cinema with the romantic comedy thriller film Run Raja Run at the age of 23 years.  Prior to films, Sujeeth started to study to be a chartered accountant, but eventually quit to pursue his passion for filmmaking. He received SIIMA Award for Best Debut Director (Telugu) in 2015 for the film Run Raja Run.

Filmography

References

External links 

Living people
Telugu film directors
1990 births

21st-century Indian film directors
South Indian International Movie Awards winners
Film directors from Andhra Pradesh
People from Anantapur, Andhra Pradesh
People from Anantapur district